The Witches of Breastwick is a 2005 erotic parody film directed by Jim Wynorski.

Premise
A married couple get involved with three witches.

Cast
Joe Souza as David Carter 
Monique Parent as Tiffany Carter
John Henry Richardson as Dr. Richards
Jodie Moore as Doctor's Assistant
Glori-Anne Gilbert as Rebecca
Stormy Daniels as Felicia
Julie K. Smith as Lola
Taimie Hannum as Holly
Antonia Dorian as LaCaCanya

Reception
The making of the film was the subject of the documentary, Popatopolis.

Sequel
The film resulted in a sequel, The Witches of Breastwick 2 (2005).

References

External links

2005 films
Films directed by Jim Wynorski
American erotic films
2000s English-language films
2000s American films